The article describes the European qualifiers for the 2023 FIBA Basketball World Cup.

First round
The 24 national teams that qualified for EuroBasket 2022 automatically qualified for this stage. They were joined by eight teams qualified through the pre-qualifiers. In total, 32 teams were divided into eight home-and-away round robin groups of four teams.

Games were played in 2021 and 2022. The bottom team from each group was eliminated. After the 2022 Russian invasion of Ukraine, both Russia and Belarus were expelled from the qualifiers with all results being annulled.

Draw
The draw for the first round was held on 31 August 2021 in Mies, Switzerland.

Seeding
Seedings were announced on 30 August 2021. Teams were seeded based on FIBA rankings. Teams from pots 1, 4, 5, and 8 were drawn to Groups A, C, E, and G. Teams from pots 2, 3, 6, and 7 were drawn to Groups B, D, F, and H.

Group A

Group B

Group C

Group D

Group E

Group F

Group G

Group H

Second round
As only three teams played in Group B and H after the disqualication of Russia and Belarus, the results of the qualified teams from Group A and G against the last-placed team were not carried over.

Group I

Group J

Group K

Group L

Notes

References

External links
Official website
Tournament summary

qualification
Basketball competitions in Europe between national teams
2021–22 in European basketball
2022–23 in European basketball